Mokra is a village in the municipality of Bela Palanka, Serbia. According to the 2002 census, the village has a population of  315 people. It is known for its many springs, cemetery, and view from the Mokra mountain. In 2011, in Serbian village of Mokra a group of enthusiasts, led by journalist Dragan Jovanović, erected a wooden statue of Svetovid.

References

Populated places in Pirot District